Thinking about the immortality of the crab is a Spanish idiom about daydreaming. The phrase is usually a humorous way of saying that one was not sitting idly, but engaged constructively in contemplation or letting one's mind wander.

The phrase is usually used to express that an individual was daydreaming, "When I have nothing to do I think about the immortality of the crab". It is also used to wake someone from a daydream; "are you thinking about the immortality of the crab?"

In poetry

In literature
Dominican Poet and writer Edgar Smith wrote a novel in Spanish called La inmortalidad del cangrejo, about a man who, tired of suffering in life, decides to kill himself, but, after three failed attempts, starts to wonder if he can die at all. The novel was critically acclaimed in Hispanic circles. It was officially released in January, 2015, in the Dominican Republic, then it was presented in June, in the US at an event at the Hamilton Grange library in Manhattan.

In film
Sena/Quina, la inmortalidad del cangrejo – 2005 film by Paolo Agazzi

Variants
The idiom is about daydreaming. Similar phrases are used in various languages.
 – thinking about the immortality of the maybug (chroust)
 – sitting and wondering about the world's early origins
 – literally, "thinking about blue almonds"; sometimes myśleć is replaced with śnić or marzyć, changing the meaning to "dreaming about blue almonds".
 – "thinking about the death of the calf"
 - "thinking about the immortality of the soul"

See also
Saying
Paremiology
Spanish proverbs

References

External links

Spanish-language idioms
Metaphors referring to animals
Crabs in culture